Spelthorne may refer to:

 Borough of Spelthorne, a local government district in the county of Surrey, England
 Spelthorne (UK Parliament constituency), Surrey constituency in the British House of Commons 
 Spelthorne College, was a single-campus sixth form college on High Street, Ashford, Surrey, England
 Spelthorne Hundred, of the historic county of Middlesex, England
 Spelthorne Sports F.C., is a football club based in the borough of Spelthorne